KHDR (96.9 FM) is a radio station that is licensed to Lenwood, California. KHRQ (94.9 FM) is a radio station that is licensed to Baker, California. Both stations are owned by Heftel Broadcasting and together they broadcast a mainstream rock format with the branding "Drive 96.9/94.9". KHDR and KHRQ serve the High Desert of California, specifically targeting travelers along the Interstate 15 corridor between Los Angeles and Las Vegas.

History
KHDR first signed on in 2002.

In 2004, KHWZ (100.1 FM) in Ludlow, California broke from the Highway Country trimulcast and switched to "The Drive". KHWZ went silent on February 25, 2011.

In early 2017, parent company KHWY, Inc. filed for chapter 11 bankruptcy, and the Highway Stations — KHDR and KHRQ, plus The Highway Vibe (KRXV, KHWY, KHYZ) and Highway Country (KIXW-FM, KIXF) — were put up for auction. Heftel Broadcasting won the auction with a $620,000 bid, with Educational Media Foundation having offered $525,000 for just KRXV and KHYZ.

In 2018, the Drive stations switched formats from mainstream rock to adult hits. On December 26, 2020, the stations returned to rock.

Syndicated programming on KHDR and KHRQ includes, as of February 8, 2021, The Woody Show weekday mornings. The Drive stations are affiliates of the Vegas Golden Knights radio network.

Repeater

See also
 Highway Country
 The Highway Vibe

References

External links

HDR
Mass media in San Bernardino County, California
2002 establishments in California
Radio stations established in 2002
Active rock radio stations in the United States